Jowshirvan (also Romanized as Jowshīrvān and Jowshīravān; also known as Gūshīrvān and Qūshīrwān) is a village in Khondab Rural District, in the Central District of Khondab County, Markazi Province, Iran. At the 2006 census, its population was 1,176, in 252 families.

References 

Populated places in Khondab County